Haswell railway station served the village of Haswell, County Durham, England, from 1837 to 1952 on the Hartlepool Dock and Railway.

History

First station 

Coordinates: 

The station opened in April 1837, although it opened to goods earlier on 23 November 1835, by the Hartlepool Dock and Railway Company. It was also used by passengers earlier, but only used on Sundays. It closed in 1858 and was resited.

Second station 

Coordinates:

The second site of the station opened in 1858. It had a station building on the northbound platform and a signal box immediately to the north. It closed to passengers on 9 June 1952. Nothing remains.

References

External links 

Disused railway stations in County Durham
Railway stations in Great Britain opened in 1837
Railway stations in Great Britain closed in 1952
1835 establishments in England
1952 disestablishments in England
Haswell, County Durham